Yvonne Pearl Burke (née Watson, later Brathwaite; born October 5, 1932) is an American politician and lawyer from California. She was the first African-American woman to represent the West Coast in Congress. She served in the U.S. Congress from 1973-1979. She represented the 2nd District on the Los Angeles County Board of Supervisors from 1992–2008. She served as Chair of Los Angeles County four times (1993–94, 1997–98, 2002–03, 2007-08) and served as chair pro tem three times (1996–97, 2001–02, 2006–07).  Her husband is William Burke, a prominent philanthropist and creator of the Los Angeles Marathon.

In 1973, she became the first member of the U.S. Congress to give birth while in office, and she was the first person to be granted maternity leave by the Speaker of the U.S. House of Representatives.

She serves on the Board of Directors of Amtrak, having been appointed to the position by President Barack Obama in 2012.

Early life and career

Perle Yvonne Watson was born on October 5, 1932, in Los Angeles as the only child of James A. Watson and the former Lola Moore.

After first attending a public school, she was sent to a model school for exceptional children. At Manual Arts High School she was a member of the debate team and served as vice president of the Latin Club her junior year and girls' vice president in her senior year.

Burke attended the University of California, Berkeley from c. 1949 to 1951 before receiving a bachelor's degree in political science from the University of California, Los Angeles in 1953. She subsequently earned a J.D. degree from the University of Southern California Law School in 1956. Burke is one of the first black women to be admitted to the University of Southern California Law School.

Her first entry into the world of politics was when she worked as a volunteer for the reelection of President Lyndon B. Johnson in 1964. She was elected to the California State Assembly in 1966, representing Los Angeles' 63rd District (1966–1972). Many of her early legislative efforts centered around juvenile issues and limiting garnishment of wages.

She served as vice-chairperson of the 1972 Democratic National Convention. She was the first African American and the first woman of color to hold that position, and presided for about fourteen hours when the chair left the convention on its last day.

That same year, she was elected to the first of three terms in the U.S. House of Representatives.

Tenure in U.S. Congress
During her tenure in Congress, she served on the House Select Committee on Assassinations, House Beauty Shop Committee, and the House Committee on Appropriations; during her tenure on the Appropriations Committee, she fought for increased funding to aid local jurisdictions to comply with desegregation mandates 

In 1973, with the birth of her daughter Autumn, Burke became the first member of Congress to give birth while in office and the first to be granted maternity leave by the Speaker of the United States House of Representatives.

She did not seek re-election to Congress in 1978, but instead ran for Attorney General of California. She lost to Republican George Deukmejian.

Later political career
In 1979, shortly after leaving Congress, Governor Jerry Brown appointed Burke to the Board of Regents of the University of California; but she resigned later that year when Governor Brown appointed her to fill a vacancy in the District 4 seat on the Los Angeles County Board of Supervisors. Burke was the first female and first African-American supervisor. Her district, however, was largely made up of affluent, conservative white areas on the coast. In 1980, Burke was defeated in her bid for a full term in the seat by Republican Deane Dana. In 1982, Brown again appointed her to the Regents.

In 1992, Burke ran for the District 2 seat on the L.A. County Board of Supervisors. The primary election was held in June, 1992, just weeks after the 1992 Los Angeles Riots. After a hard-fought campaign that often turned negative, Burke narrowly defeated State Senator Diane Watson.

In 2007, Burke announced that she would retire when her term expired in 2008. On July 27, 2007, the Los Angeles Times published a front-page story revealing that she was not living in the mostly low-income district she represented, but rather in the wealthy Brentwood neighborhood, an apparent violation of state law. Burke responded that she was living at her Brentwood mansion because the townhouse she listed in official political filings was being remodeled.

On March 29, 2012, she was nominated by President Barack Obama to serve on the Amtrak Board of Directors. Confirmed by the U.S. Senate, she has held a seat on that board ever since.

Personal life
In 1957 she married Louis Brathwaite, divorcing in 1964. She married William A. Burke in Los Angeles on June 14, 1972, just days after she won a Congressional primary against Billy Mills, a Los Angeles City Council member for whom William Burke had worked. Their daughter Autumn Burke was born on November 23, 1973.  Yvonne and Autumn are the first mother-and-daughter to both serve in the California Assembly.

Memberships 
Burke is a member of Alpha Kappa Alpha sorority.

Burke is a Fellow of the National Academy of Public Administration.

See also
Women in the United States House of Representatives 
List of African-American United States representatives

References

Further reading
 "Yvonne Brathwaite Burke", Africana: The Encyclopedia.
Ebony (September 1967). "Women Who Make State Laws": pp. 27–34.
Gray, Pamela Lee. "Yvonne Brathwaite Burke: The Congressional Career of California's First Black Congresswoman, 1972–1978." Ph.D. diss., University of Southern California, 1987.

External links

Yvonne Burke's oral history video excerpts at The National Visionary Leadership Project

Join California Yvonne Brathwaite Burke

|-

|-

|-

|-

|-

|-

|-

|-
 

|-

|-
 

|-

1932 births
20th-century American politicians
20th-century American women politicians
21st-century American politicians
21st-century American women politicians
African-American members of the United States House of Representatives
African-American state legislators in California
African-American women in politics
Amtrak people
Candidates in the 1978 United States elections
Female members of the United States House of Representatives
Jones Day people
Living people
Los Angeles County Board of Supervisors
Democratic Party members of the California State Assembly
Democratic Party members of the United States House of Representatives from California
People from Brentwood, Los Angeles
People from South Los Angeles
Politicians from Los Angeles
USC Gould School of Law alumni
University of California, Los Angeles alumni
Women state legislators in California
20th-century African-American women
20th-century African-American politicians
21st-century African-American women
21st-century African-American politicians